How Many Clouds Can You See? is the second album by English saxophonist John Surman featuring Harry Beckett, Alan Skidmore, Barre Phillips, and Tony Oxley recorded in 1970 and released on the Deram label.

Reception

Allmusic awards the album  stars and its review by Jason Ankeny states: "John Surman's second album remains his most impressive, anticipating the sound and scope of the European free jazz movement that would blossom in the decade to come".
John Kelman in his All About Jazz review states: "While woodwind multi-instrumentalist John Surman's eponymous debut was a strange mixture of everything from free improvisation to calypso, his second date, 1970's How Many Clouds Can You See?, is a much more focused affair. Surman clearly references one of his roots, John Coltrane, albeit on an instrument that the legendary saxophonist never played.

Track listing
All compositions by John Surman except where noted.

Side one
 "Galata Bridge"		
 "Caractacus"

Side two
 "Event"
 "Gathering"
 "Ritual"
 "Circle Dance"
 "How Many Clouds Can You See?"

Personnel
Musicians
 Mike Osborne – alto saxophone
 John Warren – baritone saxophone, flute
 John Surman – baritone saxophone, soprano saxophone, bass clarinet
 Barre Phillips, Harry Miller – bass 
 Alan Jackson, Tony Oxley – drums
 Alan Skidmore – tenor saxophone, flute
 Chris Pyne, Malcolm Griffiths – trombone
 Dave Holdsworth – trumpet
 Harold Beckett – trumpet, flugelhorn
 John Taylor – piano
 George Smith – tuba

Other credits
 Bill Price, Dave Grinsted – engineer
 Miles Kington – liner notes
 David Osborne – photography

References

John Surman albums
1970 albums
Deram Records albums